Gelechia overhaldensis is a moth of the family Gelechiidae. It was described by Strand in 1920. It is found in Norway.

References

Moths described in 1920
Gelechia